Jagiellońska Street may refer to:

Jagiellońska Street, Bydgoszcz
Jagiellońska Street, Kraków